90th parallel may refer to:

 90th parallel north, the North Pole
 90th parallel south, the South Pole